Tang Long or Tang Lung may refer to:

Tang Long (Water Margin), a fictional character in the Water Margin.
Tang Long, a character played by Bruce Lee in the film Way of the Dragon.
Tang Long, a character played by Donnie Yen in the film Dragon.
The TangLong, a 3x3x3 twisty puzzle cube model made by MoYu.